Tamir is a male Hebrew name.

Tamir may also refer to:

Tamir, Republic of Buryatia, a place in Russia	
Tamir River, in Mongolia
Ikh-Tamir, a district 
Tamir gol mine, an iron mine 
Tamir Airways, an Israeli domestic airline
 Tamir (missile), of the Iron Dome air defense system

See also

Tamír Triad, a fantasy book trilogy by Lynn Flewelling
Tamar (disambiguation)
Taymyr (disambiguation)